Burnby may refer to:

 Burnby, village in the East Riding of Yorkshire, England.
 Burnby Hall Gardens, gardens and museum in Pocklington, East Riding of Yorkshire
 J. G. L. Burnby (1923-2010), president of the  British Society for the History of Pharmacy